Christopher Patrick Sullivan (born March 14, 1973) is a former professional American football defensive lineman for the New England Patriots and the Pittsburgh Steelers of the National Football League (NFL). After retiring following the 2002 season, Sullivan was arrested in 2005 in Attleboro, Massachusetts and charged with driving under the influence of drugs, possession of heroin with intent to distribute, illegal possession of a prescription drug, disorderly conduct, and driving to endanger.

In 2008, two weeks after becoming sober, Sullivan attended a parents' night at a local school. The topic of the night was drugs, as Kathi Meyer had spoken to the school earlier that day. Her daughter, Taylor, had died due to underage drinking after partying with friends, after which Kathi became an advocate for ending teen addiction. 

The two fell in love after this night and married in 2011. They now travel to schools across the East Coast speaking about alcoholism and addiction.

References

External links
New England Patriots' bio

1973 births
Living people
People from North Attleborough, Massachusetts
American football defensive ends
Boston College Eagles football players
New England Patriots players
Pittsburgh Steelers players
Players of American football from Massachusetts
Sportspeople from Bristol County, Massachusetts